The Boeing C-40 Clipper is a military version of the Boeing 737 Next Generation used to transport cargo and passengers. It is used by the United States Navy, Air Force, and Marine Corps. The Navy C-40A variant is named "Clipper", whereas the USAF C-40B/C variants are officially unnamed.

Design and development
The C-40 combines the Boeing 737-700 fuselage with the strengthened wings and landing gear of the larger and heavier 737-800.

C-40A

First flight took place in April 2000 and the first of the C-40A aircraft entered service in April 2001.

The U.S. Navy Reserve was the first customer for a 737 Next Generation based "combi" aircraft (capable of transporting cargo and passengers). The Clipper was ordered by the U.S. Navy to replace its fleet of aging C-9B Skytrain IIs. The C-40A is the first new logistics aircraft in 17 years to join the U.S. Navy Reserve. The Navy Reserve provides all of the Navy's medium and heavy airlift capabilities. The Clipper meets or exceeds international noise and environmental requirements, which the fleet of Naval Reserve C-9s did not. It is also more fuel-efficient and offers increased range and payload capabilities. The Clipper is certified to operate in an all-passenger (121 passengers), all-cargo or combination ("combi") configuration that can accommodate up to three cargo pallets and 70 passengers on the main deck.

The Navy purchased the airplanes using standard commercial practices, ordering six of the 737-700C models . The first two of four aircraft were delivered on 21 April 2001 to Fleet Logistics Support Squadron Five Nine (VR-59) at the Naval Air Station/Joint Reserve Base Fort Worth, Texas, with two more aircraft following before the end of the year. The fifth and sixth aircraft were delivered in August 2002 to VR-58 at the Naval Air Station Jacksonville, Florida. Further aircraft have been delivered to VR-57 at the Naval Air Station North Island, California. The C-40A provides superior fuel efficiency, range and payload compared to the C-9B aircraft it replaced.

In the 2018 Marine Aviation Plan, the U.S. Marine Corps indicated that it intended to acquire two C-40A aircraft for airlift missions, replacing its Skytrain fleet. On 4 December 2018 an online notice was posted by the Marines seeking a supplier of C-40s to be delivered in 2020. The USMC Skytrains were retired in 2017 and to prepare for the transition to new aircraft, personnel from Marine Transport Squadron One were assigned to operate Navy Clippers until the arrival of their own aircraft.

C-40B

The United States Air Force selected the C-40B, a military version of the 737-700 Boeing Business Jet, to replace the aging fleet of C-137 aircraft used to transport U.S. combatant commanders. The Air Force awarded the medium lift contract in August 2000. The 89th Airlift Wing acquired its first C-40B aircraft in December 2002. Both units are based at Andrews Air Force Base, Maryland. The 15th Airlift Wing, Hickam AFB, Hawaii, acquired its C-40B for U.S. Pacific Command in February 2003. The 86th Airlift Wing, Ramstein AB, Germany, acquired its C-40B for U.S. Air Forces in Europe in December 2004.

The cabin area is equipped with a crew rest area, distinguished visitor compartment with sleep accommodations, two galleys and business class seating with worktables.

The C-40B is designed to be an "office in the sky" for senior military and government leaders. The aircraft features two-way broadband data communications, including secure voice and data communication; elements include internet and network access, telephones, satellites, facsimile and copy machines. The C-40B also has a computer-based passenger data system.

C-40C
The C-40C is a VIP transport aircraft often used to carry members of the Cabinet and Congress. The aircraft is equipped similarly to the C-40B, but without the advanced communications capabilities. Unique to the C-40C is the capability to change its configuration to accommodate from 42 to 111 passengers. The C-40C replaced three C-22s (a militarized Boeing 727) operated by the Air National Guard and National Guard Bureau to airlift personnel. The C-40C was the first military aircraft to be acquired in this as an off-the-shelf aircraft for the Department of Defense. The 201st Airlift Squadron, District of Columbia Air National Guard acquired two C-40C aircraft in October 2002.  The Air Force Reserve 932d Airlift Wing, Scott AFB, Illinois acquired three C-40C aircraft in 2007.

Variants

C-40A Clipper
United States Navy version of the Boeing 737-700 for high-priority cargo and passenger transport, seventeen built.
C-40B
United States Air Force version of the Boeing 737-700 based Boeing Business Jet modified as a special mission aircraft for commanders and government officials, four built.
C-40C
United States Air Force version of the Boeing 737-700 based Boeing Business Jet, operational support and transport aircraft, seven built.

Operators

 United States Air Force
 89th Airlift Wing – Andrews AFB, Maryland 
 1st Airlift Squadron 
 113th Wing – Andrews AFB, Maryland 
 201st Airlift Squadron 
 375th Air Mobility Wing – Scott AFB, Illinois 
 54th Airlift Squadron 
 932d Airlift Wing – Scott AFB, Illinois 
 73d Airlift Squadron 
 United States Navy
 VR-51 – MCAS Kaneohe Bay, Hawaii 
 VR-56 – NAS Oceana, Virginia 
 VR-57 – NAS North Island, California 
 VR-58 – NAS Jacksonville, Florida 
 VR-59 – Naval Air Station Joint Reserve Base Fort Worth, Texas 
 VR-61 – NAS Whidbey Island, Washington 
 United States Marine Corps
 VMR-1 – Naval Air Station Joint Reserve Base Fort Worth, Texas

Specifications

See also

References

External links

 C-40A and C-40B pages on Boeing.com
 The US Navy – Fact File: C-40A Clipper logistics aircraft, U.S. Naval History C-40A Clipper page
 USAF C-40B/C Factsheet
 "Clippers Hitting Their Stride Despite Past Controversy". DefenseIndustryDaily.com
 C-40 page on GlobalSecurity.com

C-40 Clipper
C-140
Twinjets
Low-wing aircraft
Aircraft first flown in 2001